The fifth season of The Bachelor premiered on 26 July 2017. This season features Matty Johnson, a 30-year-old marketing manager from Sydney, New South Wales, courting 22 women. Johnson previously appeared on the second season of The Bachelorette Australia featuring Georgia Love, where he was the runner-up.

Contestants 
The season began with 22 contestants.

Call-out order 

 The contestant received the first impression rose.
 The contestant received a rose during a date.
 The contestant received a rose outside of a date or the rose ceremony.
 The contestant was eliminated.
 The contestant was eliminated during a date.
 The contestant quit the competition.
 The contestant was eliminated outside the rose ceremony.
 The contestant won the competition.

Episodes

Episode 1
Original airdate: 26 July 2017

Episode 2
Original airdate: 27 July 2017

Episode 3
Original airdate: 2 August 2017

Episode 4
Original airdate: 3 August 2017

Episode 5
Original airdate: 9 August 2017

Episode 6
Original airdate: 10 August 2017

Episode 7
Original airdate: 16 August 2017

Episode 8

Original airdate: 17 August 2017

Episode 9
Original airdate: 23 August 2017

Episode 10
Original airdate: 24 August 2017

Episode 11
Original airdate: 30 August 2017

Episode 12
Original airdate: 31 August 2017

Episode 13
Original airdate: 6 September 2017

Episode 14
Original airdate: 7 September 2017

Episode 15
Original airdate: 13 September 2017

Episode 16
Original airdate: 14 September 2017

Ratings

References

2017 Australian television seasons
Australian (season 05)
Television shows filmed in Australia